In digital circuits, propagation time is the delay of the basic inverter of a given family. Thus, it measures the speed at which such family can operate.

References

See also
 Delay calculation
 Contamination delay
 Propagation delay

Digital circuits
Digital electronics
Timing in electronic circuits